The Music Hall is a concert hall in Aberdeen, Scotland, formerly the city's Assembly Rooms, located on Union Street in the city centre.

History

The venue was designed in 1920 by Archibald Simpson, a notable Aberdeen architect, and cost £11,500 when it was originally constructed in 1822. It was opened to the public as a concert hall in 1859. In September 1896, the building hosted the first cinema screening in Aberdeen.

The building was renovated in the 1980s. It was closed for further extensive renovation in 2016 with a £9 million investment, and reopened in December 2018.

Suffragette activism
Aberdeen Music Hall was the scene of a suffragette activist incident in December 1907, when protesters disrupted a visit from the then Chancellor of the Exchequer, Henry Asquith. This resulted in a fight in the orchestra pit and the suffragettes being thrown out. It also compromised Caroline Phillips' position as honourary secretary of the Aberdeen branch of the Women's Social and Political Union due to her opposition to this protest - she was ultimately dismissed in 1909.

Another incident occurred in 1912 when women hid with 'explosives' which turned out to be toy guns, when then Chancellor of the Exchequer Lloyd George was due to speak. The three women were arrested and imprisoned.

War Memorial
There is a bronze plaque inside the lobby of the Music Hall, bearing the names of all those from Aberdeen who served in the Spanish Civil War (1936–1939). The memorial was removed during the 2016 refurbishment and as of August 2019 is currently stored at the Aberdeen Trades Council.

Events
The Music Hall regularly plays host to the Royal Scottish National Orchestra, the Scottish Chamber Orchestra and the BBC Scottish Symphony Orchestra, the annual Aberdeen International Youth Festival, and various pop/rock artists. Some notable artists who have performed at the Music Hall include David Bowie, Emeli Sandé, Led Zeppelin, Bullet for My Valentine, Placebo, Morrissey, Iron Maiden and Black Sabbath.

References

External links
Music Hall Official website

Commercial buildings completed in 1822
Theatres in Aberdeen
Category A listed buildings in Aberdeen
Theatres completed in 1822
Music venues completed in 1859
1859 establishments in the United Kingdom
1822 establishments in Scotland